KKBI (106.1 FM) is a radio station broadcasting a country music format. The station is licensed to Broken Bow, Oklahoma, United States, and is owned by J.D.C. Radio, Inc.  KKBI features programming from Jones Radio Network and CNN Radio.

References

External links

KBI